Piduguralla railway station (station code:PGRL), is an Indian Railway station in Piduguralla of Guntur district in Andhra Pradesh. It is situated on Pagidipalli–Nallapadu section and is administered by Guntur railway division of South Coast Railway zone. It is selected as one of the station to be developed under Adarsh station scheme.

See also 
List of railway stations in India

References 

Railway stations in Guntur district
Railway stations in Guntur railway division